FoodFirst Global Restaurants (formerly Bravo Brio Restaurant Group) is the parent company of the Bravo! Cucina Italiana and Brio Tuscan Grille restaurant chains in the United States. It was established in Columbus, Ohio as Bravo Brio Restaurant Group in 1992 by Rick and Chris Doody in collaboration with Executive Chef Phil Yandolino. In 2018, the company was sold to Spice Private Equity Ltd. and rebranded as FoodFirst Global Restaurants, and is now based in Orlando, Florida. Steve Layt is the company's chief executive officer. Brio specializes in Northern Italian cuisine including bruschetta, pizza, pasta, steaks, seafood, soup and salad. Bravo! restaurants have a Roman ruin style décor and an open, Italian style kitchen focusing primarily on pastas and pizzas.

History
Bravo Brio Restaurant Group (BBRG) was founded in 1992 by Rick Doody, his brother Chris Doody, and Executive Chef Phil Yandolino. Initially, the restaurant group consisted of one brand, Bravo Cucina Italiana. The first restaurant opened in Columbus, Ohio. Eventually, the restaurant group launched a second similar, but more upscale brand, Brio Tuscan Grille.

In October 2010, BBRG went public and their IPO raised net proceeds of $62.4 million.

On May 24, 2018, BBRG was sold to Spice Private Equity Ltd. and renamed FoodFirst Global Restaurants. BBRG sold for about $100 million and their shareholders received $4.05 per share in cash. At that moment, Bravo and Brio managed 110 stores in 32 states, for an estimated sales volume of around 400 million dollars.

On April 10, 2020, FoodFirst Global Holdings Inc. filed for voluntary Chapter 11 bankruptcy protection in the Middle District of Florida.

Executive Officers

 CEO - Steve Layt
 Chairman - Antonio Bonchristiano
 CFO - Brian Grusi
 Chief Culinary Officer - John Imbriolo

Legal 
In 2018, BBRG announced it had settled two lawsuits in 2017 for a total of $5.6 million. A class-action lawsuit filed in Missouri involved 8,000+ former and current employees and the Company settled the case for $4 million. A class-action lawsuit filed in New York involved over 500 employees and the Company settled the case for $1.6 million.

References

Restaurant chains in the United States
Restaurant groups in the United States
Restaurants established in 1992
Companies formerly listed on the Nasdaq
1992 establishments in Ohio
2010 initial public offerings
2018 mergers and acquisitions
Private equity portfolio companies
Companies that filed for Chapter 11 bankruptcy in 2020